Club Deportivo Hungaritos Agustinos is a Peruvian football club, playing in the city of Iquitos, Peru.

The club played at the highest level of Peruvian football in 1986.

Honours

Copa Perú:
Winners: 1985

References

Football clubs in Peru
Association football clubs established in 1954